Great Shefford railway station was a railway station in Great Shefford, Berkshire, UK, on the Lambourn Valley Railway.

History
The station opened on 1 April 1898 as West Shefford. It was renamed Great Shefford in November 1900.

In 1923, a crane costing £179 was installed to facilitate the handling of heavy goods – particularly timber.  The crane had a loading capacity of 64 tons. The station had a coal yard, and also dealt with dairy produce, livestock, and racehorses.

The station closed to all traffic on 4 January 1960.

References

Lambourn Valley Railway
Disused railway stations in Berkshire
Former Great Western Railway stations
Railway stations in Great Britain opened in 1898
Railway stations in Great Britain closed in 1960